Santa Ana de los Cuatro Ríos de Cuenca, commonly referred to as Cuenca (Kichwa: Tumipampa), is the capital and largest city of the Azuay Province of Ecuador.

The center of the city is listed as a UNESCO World Heritage Site due to its many historical buildings and its historical importance as an agricultural and administrative center.

History

“The plateau is a place treasured by empires," comments Jeffrey Herlihy-Mera. "The Cañari then Inca and then Spanish occupied the region in the last two millennia, each renaming it in their own language. Now the capital city is called Cuenca and the province Azuay.”

According to studies and archeological discoveries, the origins of the first inhabitants go back to the year 8060 BC in the Cave of Chopsi. They were hunters, hunting everything the Páramo offered them, and nomads, following the animals and seasons. Their culture is represented by tools such as arrows and spears, which have been found throughout the Andean valley. The culture was most present about 5585 BC.

Later, the early indigenous people used the stable climate, fertile soil, and abundant water to develop agriculture. They grew potatoes, melloco, chocho, squash, and quinoa. They also domesticated animals such as cuys (guinea pigs) and camelids: llamas and alpacas.

Their technology was also advanced. For example, they began creating ceramics. In fact, ceramics constitute the greatest number of artifacts which archeologists use to study their culture. The period from 5000 BCE to 2000 BCE is not well represented in the archeological record. Beginning around 2000 BCE, the people developed a more highly organized society, demonstrating delegated responsibilities, such as the managing of water and control of plagues. People were specialized as administrative and religious authorities (known as shamans). This occurred during the periods of Chaullabamba, Huayco, Pirincay, Monjas, Putushio, Huancarcucho, and Jubones. From then until 500 AD began the periods of Tacalshapa III and the Cañari people, who were absorbed into the Incas in the 15th century.

Pre-Columbian society
Cuenca was originally a Cañari settlement called Guapondeleg. Archeologists believe Cuenca was founded around 500 AD. Guapondeleg translates into "land as big as heaven." Less than half a century before the conquistadors landed, the Incas, after a bitter struggle, conquered the Cañari and occupied Guapondeleg and the surrounding area. Though the Incas replaced the Cañari architecture with their own, they did not suppress the Cañari or their impressive achievements in astronomy and agriculture. As was customary for the Incas, they absorbed useful achievements into their culture. They renamed the city Tomebamba. The city became known as the second Cusco, a regional capital.

After the defeat of the Cañari, likely in the 1470s, the Inca emperor, Tupac Yupanqui, ordered the construction of a grand city to be called Pumapungo, "the door of the Puma." Its magnificence was said to have rivaled that of the Inca capital of Cuzco. Indians told stories to the Spanish chroniclers of golden temples and other such wonders, but by the time the Spaniards found the legendary city, all that remained were ruins. They wondered what happened to the fabled splendor and riches of the second Inca capital. After having been abandoned by the Cañari and then the Incas, Tomebamba was sparsely populated until the 1550s.

Tomebamba is considered a candidate for the mythical city of gold which the Spanish called El Dorado. The Spanish thought El Dorado was burned by the inhabitants after they heard of the Spanish conquests. Tomebamba's destruction by its inhabitants prior to the arrival of the Spanish suggests it may have been what the Spanish called El Dorado.

Spanish settlement
The Spanish settlement of Cuenca was founded on April 12, 1557, by the explorer Gil Ramírez Dávalos. Andrés Hurtado de Mendoza, then Viceroy of Peru had commissioned the founding and ordered the city named after his home town of Cuenca, Spain. It was founded decades after other major Spanish settlements in the region, such as Quito (1534), Guayaquil (1538), and Loja (1548).
Cuenca's population and importance grew steadily during the colonial era.

Cuenca reached the peak of its importance in the first years of Ecuador's independence; Cuenca achieved its independence on November 3, 1820. It became the capital of one of the three provinces that made up the nascent republic. The other two capitals were Guayaquil and Quito.

Population
As per the last INEC estimate for 2015, the population of the Cuenca canton was 580,000 inhabitants, of which 400,000 constitute the urban population (i.e., the population of the city proper). Local publications estimate that the expat population is between 4,000 and 6,000. The economic development is based on industry and agricultural development.

The Cuenca Metropolitan Area includes the cities of Azogues, Biblian, and Deleg in the Cañar province and the cities of Paute and Gualaceo in the Azuay province with a population of 730,000 inhabitants; however, Cuenca's influence in the cultural, economic, and educational areas extends to all the remaining cities  around the city.

Economy
Cuenca is known for its textile making, as well as furniture and other crafts like hats and shoes. The straw hats known around the world as Panama hats are in fact made in Cuenca by local artisans. Cuenca also exports flowers to the United States and many countries in Europe. While farming has shrunk in the past years, it is still an important sector of the city's economy. Beekeeping has also become key for growing crops. Some of the typical crops grown in the region include wheat, barley, rye, oats, and corn. Since Cuenca is located in the Andes mountains surrounded by forested areas nearby, mining and logging are also local industries. Some of the common mined resources are kaolin, plaster, limestone, sand, specialized rocks, and carbon. Cuenca is also known for making car tires.

The tourism industry continues to grow. Cuenca has many cathedrals that are a part of the cultural heritage of the city and some important national parks as well as its main university, La Universidad de Cuenca.

For the future, Ecuador has been working on producing electrolytic hydrogen to better use environmentally-friendly resources.

At the turn of the century, the country's economy was affected by the change in currency, from sucre to USD.

Geography
Cuenca, capital of the province of Azuay, is located in the sierra of the Andes in the Austro or southern region of Ecuador. It is approximately 470 km south of Quito and 200 km southeast of Guayaquil.

The dominant features of the city's geography are also the source of its name in Spanish: the four rivers of Cuenca (meaning a basin made by a confluence of rivers). These rivers are the Tomebamba (named after the Inca culture), Yanuncay, Tarqui and Machangara, in order of importance. The first three of these rivers originate in the Páramo of Parque Nacional Cajas to the west of the city.

Parishes
Cuenca Canton contains the following parishes:

Baños
Chaucha
Checa (Jidcay)
Chiquintad
Cumbe
Llacao
Molleturo
Nulti
Octavio Cordero Palacios (Santa Rosa)
Paccha
Quingeo
Ricaurte
San Joaquín
Santa Ana
Sayausi
Sidcay
Sinincay
Tarqui
Turi
Valle
Victoria del Portete (Irquis)

Climate
Cuenca features a subtropical highland climate (Cfb) under the Köppen climate classification. Like the rest of the Ecuadorian Andes, Cuenca enjoys a mild climate year-round. Days are generally warm and nights are cool enough that sweaters or jackets are usually desired. The average daily temperature is 14.7 °C (58.5 °F). There are two seasons: rainy and dry. The dry season, with some variation, falls between June and December. The rainy season, which is characterized by bright sunny mornings and afternoon showers, falls between January and May. The heaviest rains come in the invierno (wet season) of March, April and May.

Education

Universities 
The first university in the city, the [[Universidad de Cuenca]] was established in 1867. It is considered the third oldest university of the country, after the Universidad Central del Ecuador (1836) and the Universidad Nacional de Loja (1859). Ever since, the city has been growing and more universities were created with new careers. This led to the declaration of Cuenca as the City of Universities by the National Assembly of Ecuador on January 4, 2011.

The city has the following Universities:
Universidad de Cuenca (UCUENCA)
Universidad Politécnica Salesiana (UPS)
Universidad del Azuay (UDA)
Universidad Católica de Cuenca (UCACUE)

The first university is classified as an A category university; the subsequent next three are B category. universities This was stated by the Council for Evaluation, Validation and Assurance of the Quality in Superior Education of Ecuador (CEAACES)

Primary and secondary schools 
International schools:
 École franco-équatorienne Joseph-de-Jussieu (French school)
 Colegio Alemán Stiehle (German school)
 Unidad Educativa Bilingue Interamericana

Main sights

Most tourists visit the historic area, which is a UNESCO World Heritage Site, between the river Tomebamba and the streets of Gran Colombia to the north, General Torres to the west, and Hermano Miguel to the east. This area's compactness, grid-like layout, and numerous readily identifiable monuments make it easy to navigate. Outside this area the city can be confusing, as there are dozens of narrow colonial streets with similar buildings.

Major fiestas of Cuenca come at the time of the "Mass of Children" that is carried out the day of the Arrival of Kings (January 6 - Epiphany Day), or in the commemoration of the independence of the city (November 3), during which processions, cultural acts, and dances are organized.
The nearby Cañar plantation (in the county of the same name) features the biggest Inca ruins in Ecuador.

Landmarks
Old Cathedral (Iglesia de El Sagrario). Built in 1557, the edifice eventually became too small for the town's attendants. In 1880, a new cathedral was built as the replacement. The old cathedral, no longer consecrated, has been restored and is now used as a museum.
New Cathedral (official name: Catedral Metropolitana de la Inmaculada Concepción). Its towers are truncated due to a calculation error of the architect. Had it been constructed as planned, the foundation would not bear the weight of the full towers. In spite of the architect's immeasurable mistake, the New Cathedral of Cuenca, completed in 1975, is a monumental work of faith. A combination of Romanesque Revival and Neo-Gothic in style, the church's blue and white domes have become a symbol for the city. Its façade is made of alabaster and local marble, while the floor of the nave is covered with pink marble, brought from Carrara (Italy). At its inauguration, the newly constructed Cathedral could accommodate 9,000 of Cuenca's 10,000 inhabitants at that time.
Park Abdon Calderon. It is located in the center of Cuenca between the old and new cathedrals. On the park benches, people meet to converse and absorb its tranquility. The municipal offices are located nearby.
Monastery of El Carmen de Asuncion. In the atrium a colorful flower market supplements the beauty of the church, which was founded in 1682. A sculpted stone façade and a golden pulpit make the church very attractive.
Monastery and Museum of La Concepcion, with 17th-century tombs and a complete collection of religious art.
House of the Ecuadorian Culture
Municipal Museum Remigio Crespo Toral
Museum of the Central Bank
Museum of the Aboriginal Cultures
Church of Santo Domingo
San Blas
Turi the Mirador
Ruinas de todos los santos. In this ancient place, four niches of Inca origin exist. Their form is trapezoidal, and they are built of stone. It includes the remains of a colonial mill.

Surroundings
Molleturo, a vast rural area (about ) situated in Ecuador's southern Andes, is composed of several little villages (hamlets). The centre of the area is located 1.5 hours away by car from the nearest big city (Cuenca). This distance, however, is very short compared to ten years ago, when there was no road for cars and it took people three days of mule riding to get to Cuenca. In spite of the advantages, the road has also had negative impacts on the ecological system, which is still very important for people's daily survival.
Jima, located near Cuenca, is a hiking hotspot for southern Ecuador. Hikes for all skill levels are available, including a three-day hike from the peaks of the Andes mountains down into the lush tropical rainforest of the Amazon basin.
Gualaceo
This same area includes a stone corridor in snake form, built in pre-Inca time, known for gold and silver smiths and local jewelry.

It is a place for bird watchers and trout fishermen.

A city with a colonial atmosphere, one of its highlights is San Francisco's convent, built on the summit of a huaca (sacred mountain) of the prehispanic residents.
Stores, bathrooms, a tambo for the Inca, and a temple dedicated to the sun are all part of Ingapirca, which was built in the 15th century by orders of Huayna Capac.

Culture

Festivities
One of the festivities celebrated in Cuenca and in other parts of Ecuador is "El Carnaval." This holiday is celebrated three days prior to Ash Wednesday. Families get together to celebrate what started as a "pagan ritual." Now it is celebrated by wetting friends and random people with water balloons and spraying "Carioca," a nonstaining foam.

Additionally, Cuenca's Independence Day is celebrated at the beginning of November. The festivities span a number of days and consist of various parades, concerts, cultural events, and artisan fairs.

Gastronomy
The gastronomy of Cuenca shares characteristics with other mountainous parts of Ecuador. As in other regions of Ecuador, cuy (guinea pig) and hornado are popular traditional dishes. Additionally, dishes made from potatoes and corn (mote (food)) such as Llapingachos, mote pillo, mote pata, and morocho are popular. Trout, which can be caught in nearby El Cajas National Park, is another popular dish.

In Cuenca, lunch is the largest meal of the day and is typically served in two courses. The first course is soup, which is followed by a plate of stewed or grilled meat and rice.

Transport

Bus station
Cuenca's interprovincial bus station, called the Terminal Terrestre as it is in most cities, is well organized and clean. It is located on Avenida España in the northeastern corner of the city, a twenty-minute walk or a brief taxi ride from the historic center. Also, many city buses provide frequent service as indicated by the "Terminal Terrestre" placard on the windshield.

Buses arrive and depart throughout the day. Service is available to major cities, such as Guayaquil and Quito and also to nearby cities such as Loja, Riobamba, or Machala. The distance to Guayaquil is 243 km. and the bus takes nearly 4 hours on the highway Durán-Pto.Inca-Molleturo (I582W), a scenic ride through the Cajas National Park. Quito is 497 km from Cuenca, and the trip takes around 10 hours on the Pan-American Highway (I35N). Many prefer to travel by bus at night. Those who choose to travel overnight should exercise caution due to reported bus hijacks, which have resulted in armed robbery.

Airport
The airport, Aeropuerto Mariscal Lamar (Mariscal Lamar International Airport), is due east of the Terminal Terrestre (bus station) on Avenida España. It is a five-minute walk from the bus station. Two airlines currently serve Cuenca: Avianca Ecuador and LATAM Ecuador both fly to Quito. It is Ecuador's third-busiest airport, with over 1,400,000 passengers passing through its gates every year.

Tram

A tram/light rail line was completed in early 2019, and the tramway opened May 25, 2020.
The line runs a total of 10.5 km.(7 miles) with 27 stations, starting at Cuenca Industrial Park in the north, crossing the Historic Center of Cuenca, and ending south at the entrance to Baños.

Cuenca public transportation statistics
According to the Moovit Public Transport Index, Cuenca's bus system compares extremely favorably with other cities in Latin America. The average amount of time people spend commuting with public transit in Cuenca, for example to and from work, is 51 minutes on a weekday, with only 7% of public transit riders riding for more than 2 hours every day. The average amount of time people wait at a bus stop or bus station for public transit is 11 minutes, while a mere 9% of riders wait for over 20 minutes on average every day. The average distance people usually ride in a single trip with public transit is 3.8 km, while 0% travel for over 12 km in a single direction. In 2018, the flat-rate bus fare is 30 US cents, with fares for children, students, seniors, and the disabled costing only 15 US cents.

International relations

Twin towns – Sister cities
Cuenca is twinned with:

 Rosario, Argentina
 Tempe, Arizona, United States
 Ossining, New York, United States

See also

References

External links

 Official Travel Guide To Cuenca, with maps, hotels, restaurants, photos & more information about Cuenca
 A Guide to Using the City Buses in Cuenca
 Cuenca government
 Universidad de Cuenca
 Universidad del azuay
 Ecuador Special Events and Holiday Calendar
 Cultura, tradición y turismo de Cuenca - Ecuador
 Cuenca in 360° view, Map of Cuenca 
 Business Directory 
 Gastronomic Guide 

 
Populated places in Azuay Province
Populated places established in 1557
Provincial capitals in Ecuador
World Heritage Sites in Ecuador
1557 establishments in the Spanish Empire